"All the Lonely Women in the World" is a song written and recorded by American country singer-songwriter Bill Anderson. It was released as a single in 1972 via Decca Records and became a major hit the same year.

Background and release
"All the Lonely Women in the World" was recorded on November 16, 1971, at the Bradley Studio, located in Nashville, Tennessee. The sessions were produced by Owen Bradley, who would serve as Anderson's producer through most of years with Decca Records. The track "Lonely Weekends" was also recorded at the same session,

"All the Lonely Women in the World" was released as a single by Decca Records in February 1972. The song spent 15 weeks on the Billboard Hot Country Singles before reaching number two in May 1972. In Canada, the single reached number two on the RPM Country Songs chart. It was released on his 1972 LP, Bill Anderson Sings for "All the Lonely Women in the World".

Track listing
7" vinyl single
 "All the Lonely Women in the World" – 2:32
 "It Was Time for Me to Move on Anyway" – 2:31

Charts

Weekly charts

Year-end charts

References

1972 singles
1972 songs
Bill Anderson (singer) songs
Decca Records singles
Song recordings produced by Owen Bradley
Songs written by Bill Anderson (singer)